L'Abadía Cenero (in Spanish, Cenero) is a parish of the municipality of Gijón / Xixón, in Asturias, Spain. Its population was 1,467 in 2012.

The highest point of the parish is the Monte Los Llanos with 279 meters. The lowest one is near the River Pinzales, exiting Cenero, with 16 meters.

L'Abadía Cenero is the biggest district of Gijón / Xixón. Its northern border (close to Tremañes) is heavily industrialized, due to its proximity with Arcelor.

At Veranes, one of the neighbours of L'Abadía Cenero, is located the Roman Villa of Veranes.

Villages and their neighbourhoods

External links
 Official Toponyms - Principality of Asturias website.
 Official Toponyms: Laws - BOPA Nº 229 - Martes, 3 de octubre de 2006 & ''DECRETO 105/2006, de 20 de septiembre, por el que se determinan los topónimos oficiales del concejo de Gijón."

Parishes in Gijón